Snacks is the debut extended play of British musician and DJ Jax Jones. It was released on 28 November 2018 through Universal Music Group, which is the same day the single "Play" was released. The EP contains all of Jax Jones' previously released singles starting from "House Work". It was later re-released in July 2019 with "All Day and Night", "One Touch" and "Harder". The EP was later expanded into Jones' first full-length album Snacks (Supersize), which was released on 6 September 2019. Every song on the album was released as an official single, as well.

Track listing

Notes
  signifies a co-producer.
  signifies an additional producer.
  track was not included in original release.

Sample credits
 "You Don’t Know Me" contains samples from "Body Language", written by Walter Merziger, Arno Kammermier, Patrick Bodmer and Phillip D. Young, as performed by M.A.N.D.Y. & Booka Shade.

Charts

Weekly charts

Year-end charts

Certifications

References

2018 debut EPs
Jax Jones albums
Universal Music Group EPs